Salarpur Khadar is a census town in Gautam Buddha Nagar district in the Indian state of Uttar Pradesh.

Demographics 
 India census, Salarpur Khadar had a population of 10,772. Males constitute 58% of the population and females 42%. Salarpur Khadar has an average literacy rate of 66%, higher than the national average of 59.5%: male literacy is 75%, and female literacy is 53%. In Salarpur Khadar, 19% of the population is under 6 years of age.

References

The Institute of Quality Studies (IQS)

Cities and towns in Gautam Buddh Nagar district